The International Booker Prize (formerly known as the Man Booker International Prize) is an international literary award hosted in the United Kingdom. The introduction of the International Prize to complement the Man Booker Prize was announced in June 2004. Sponsored by the Man Group, from 2005 until 2015 the award was given every two years to a living author of any nationality for a body of work published in English or generally available in English translation. It rewarded one author's "continued creativity, development and overall contribution to fiction on the world stage", and was a recognition of the writer's body of work rather than any one title.

Since 2016, the award has been given annually to a single book translated into English and published in the United Kingdom or Ireland, with a £50,000 prize for the winning title, shared equally between author and translator.

Crankstart, the charitable foundation of Sir Michael Moritz and his wife, Harriet Heyman began supporting The Booker Prizes on 1 June 2019. From this date, the prizes were known as The Booker Prize and The International Booker Prize. Of their support for The Booker Prize Foundation and the prizes, Moritz commented: "Neither of us can imagine a day where we don’t spend time reading a book. The Booker Prizes are ways of spreading the word about the insights, discoveries, pleasures and joy that spring from great fiction".

History

Pre-2016
Whereas the Man Booker Prize was open only to writers from the Commonwealth, Ireland, and Zimbabwe, the International Prize was open to all nationalities who had work available in English including translations. The award was worth £60,000 and given every two years to a living author's entire body of literature, similar to the Nobel Prize for Literature. The Man Booker International Prize also allowed for a separate award for translation. If applicable, the winning author could choose their translators to receive a prize sum of £15,000.

The 2005 inaugural winner of the prize was Albanian writer Ismail Kadare. Praising its concerted judgement, the journalist Hephzibah Anderson noted that the Man Booker International Prize was "fast becoming the more significant award, appearing an ever more competent alternative to the Nobel".

2016 onwards
In July 2015 it was announced that the Independent Foreign Fiction Prize would be disbanded. The prize money from that award would be folded into the Man Booker International Prize, which would henceforth act similarly to the Independent prize: awarding an annual book of fiction translated into English, with the £50,000 prize split between author and translator. Each shortlisted author and translator receives £1,000. Its aim is to encourage publishing and reading of quality works in translation and to highlight the work of translators. Judges select a longlist of ten books in March, followed by a shortlist of five in April, with the winner announced in May.

Nominations

2005
The inaugural Man Booker International Prize was judged by John Carey (Chair), Alberto Manguel and Azar Nafisi. The nominees were announced on 2 June 2005 at Georgetown University in Washington, D.C. Albanian novelist Ismail Kadare was named the inaugural International Prize winner in 2005. Head judge, Professor John Carey said Kadare is "a universal writer in the tradition of storytelling that goes back to Homer." Kadare said he was "deeply honoured" at being awarded the prize. Kadare was also able to select a translator to receive an additional prize of £15,000. The writer received his award in Edinburgh on 27 June.
Winner
Ismail Kadare

Nominees

 Margaret Atwood (Canada)
 Saul Bellow (US)
 Gabriel García Márquez (Colombia)
 Günter Grass (Germany)
 Ismail Kadare (Albania)
 Milan Kundera (Czech Republic)

 Stanisław Lem (Poland)
 Doris Lessing (UK)
 Ian McEwan (UK)
 Naguib Mahfouz (Egypt)
 Tomas Eloy Martinez (Argentina)
 Kenzaburō Ōe (Japan)

 Cynthia Ozick (US)
 Philip Roth (US)
 Muriel Spark (UK)
 Antonio Tabucchi (Italy)
 John Updike (US)
 A.B. Yehoshua (Israel)

2007
The 2007 prize was judged by Elaine Showalter, Nadine Gordimer and Colm Tóibin. The nominees for the second Man Booker International Prize were announced on 12 April 2007 at Massey College in Toronto. Nigerian author Chinua Achebe was awarded the International Prize for his literary career in 2007. Judge Nadine Gordimer said Achebe was "the father of modern African literature" and that he was "integral" to world literature. Achebe received his award on 28 June in Oxford.
Winner
 Chinua Achebe

Nominees

 Chinua Achebe (Nigeria)
 Margaret Atwood (Canada)
 John Banville (Ireland)
 Peter Carey (Australia)
 Don DeLillo (US)

 Carlos Fuentes (Mexico)
 Doris Lessing (UK)
 Ian McEwan (UK)
 Harry Mulisch (Netherlands)
 Alice Munro (Canada)

 Michael Ondaatje (Sri Lanka/Canada)
 Amos Oz (Israel)
 Philip Roth (US)
 Salman Rushdie (India/UK)
 Michel Tournier (France)

2009
The 2009 prize was judged by Jane Smiley (Chair), Amit Chaudhuri and Andrey Kurkov. The nominees for the third Man Booker International Prize were announced on 18 March 2009 at The New York Public Library. Canadian short story writer Munro was named the winner of the prize in 2009 for her lifetime body of work. Judge Jane Smiley said picking a winner had been "a challenge", but Munro had won the panel over. On Munro's work, Smiley said "Her work is practically perfect. Any writer has to gawk when reading her because her work is very subtle and precise. Her thoughtfulness about every subject is so concentrated." Munro, who said she was "totally amazed and delighted" at her win, received the award at Trinity College Dublin on 25 June.
Winner
 Alice Munro

Nominees

 Peter Carey (Australia)
 Evan S. Connell (US)
 Mahasweta Devi (India)
 E. L. Doctorow (US)
 James Kelman (UK)

 Mario Vargas Llosa (Peru)
 Arnošt Lustig (Czech Republic)
 Alice Munro (Canada)
 V. S. Naipaul (Trinidad/UK)
 Joyce Carol Oates (US)

 Antonio Tabucchi (Italy)
 Ngũgĩ wa Thiong'o (Kenya)
 Dubravka Ugrešić (Croatia)
 Lyudmila Ulitskaya (Russia)

2011
The 2011 prize was judged by Rick Gekoski (Chair), Carmen Callil (withdrew in protest over choice of winner) and Justin Cartwright. The nominees for the fourth Man Booker International Prize were announced on 30 March 2011 at a ceremony in Sydney, Australia. John le Carré asked to be removed from consideration, saying he was "flattered", but that he does not compete for literary prizes. However, judge Dr Rick Gekoski said although he was disappointed that le Carré wanted to withdraw, his name would remain on the list. American novelist Roth was announced as the winner on 18 May 2011 at the Sydney Writers' Festival. Of his win, Roth said "This is a great honour and I'm delighted to receive it." The writer said he hoped the prize would bring him to the attention of readers around the world who are not currently familiar with his body of work. Roth received his award in London on 28 June; however, he was unable to attend in person due to ill health, so he sent a short video instead. After Roth was announced as the winner, Carmen Callil withdrew from the judging panel, saying "I don't rate him as a writer at all... in 20 years' time will anyone read him?" Callil later wrote an editorial in The Guardian explaining her position and why she chose to leave the panel.
Winner

Philip Roth

Nominees

 Wang Anyi (China)
 Juan Goytisolo (Spain)
 James Kelman (UK)
 John le Carré (UK)
 Amin Maalouf (Lebanon)

 David Malouf (Australia)
 Dacia Maraini (Italy)
 Rohinton Mistry (India/Canada)
 Philip Pullman (UK)
 Marilynne Robinson (US)

 Philip Roth (US)
 Su Tong (China)
 Anne Tyler (US)

2013
The 2013 prize was judged by Christopher Ricks (Chair), Elif Batuman, Aminatta Forna, Yiyun Li and Tim Parks. The nominees for the fifth Man Booker International Prize were announced on 24 January 2013. Marilynne Robinson was the only writer out of the ten nominees who had been nominated for the prize before. Lydia Davis, best known as a short story writer, was announced as the winner of the 2013 prize on 22 May at a ceremony at the Victoria and Albert Museum in London. The official announcement of Davis' award on the Man Booker Prize website described her work as having "the brevity and precision of poetry." Judging panel chair Christopher Ricks commented that "There is vigilance to her stories, and great imaginative attention. Vigilance as how to realise things down to the very word or syllable; vigilance as to everybody's impure motives and illusions of feeling."
Winner
Lydia Davis

Nominees

 U R Ananthamurthy (India)
 Aharon Appelfeld (Israel)
 Lydia Davis (US)
 Intizar Hussain (Pakistan)
 Yan Lianke (China)

 Marie NDiaye (France)
 Josip Novakovich (Croatia/USA)
 Marilynne Robinson (USA)
 Vladimir Sorokin (Russia)
 Peter Stamm (Switzerland)

2015
The 2015 prize was judged by Marina Warner (Chair), Nadeem Aslam, Elleke Boehmer, Edwin Frank and Wen-chin Ouyang. The nominees for the sixth Man Booker International Prize were announced on 24 March 2015. László Krasznahorkai became the first author from Hungary to receive the Man Booker award. The prize was given to recognise his "achievement in fiction on the world stage". British author Marina Warner, who chaired the panel of judges that selected Krasznahorkai for the award, compared his writing to Kafka and Beckett. Krasznahorkai's translators, George Szirtes and Ottilie Mulzet, shared the £15,000 translators' prize.
Winner
László Krasznahorkai

Nominees

 César Aira (Argentina)
 Hoda Barakat (Lebanon)
 Maryse Condé (Guadeloupe)
 Mia Couto (Mozambique)
 Amitav Ghosh (India)

 László Krasznahorkai (Hungary)
 Alain Mabanckou (Republic of the Congo)
 Marlene van Niekerk (South Africa)
 Ibrahim al-Koni (Libya)
 Fanny Howe (USA)

2016
The 2016 prize was judged by Boyd Tonkin (Chair), Tahmima Anam, David Bellos, Daniel Medin and Ruth Padel. The nominees for the seventh Man Booker International Prize were announced on 14 April 2016. The six nominees were chosen from a longlist of thirteen. Han became the first Korean author to win the prize and, under the new format for 2016, Smith became the first translator to share the prize. British journalist Boyd Tonkin, who chaired the judging panel, said that the decision was unanimous. He also said of the book "in a style both lyrical and lacerating, it reveals the impact of this great refusal both on the heroine herself and on those around her. This compact, exquisite and disturbing book will linger long in the minds, and maybe the dreams, of its readers."
Winner
Han Kang (South Korea), Deborah Smith (translator), for The Vegetarian (채식주의자)

Shortlist
José Eduardo Agualusa (Angola), Daniel Hahn (translator), for A General Theory of Oblivion (Teoria Geral do Esquecimento)
Elena Ferrante (Italy), Ann Goldstein (translator), for The Story of the Lost Child (Storia della bambina perduta)
Yan Lianke (China), Carlos Rojas (translator), for The Four Books (四書)
Orhan Pamuk (Turkey), Ekin Oklap (translator), for A Strangeness in My Mind (Kafamda Bir Tuhaflık)
Robert Seethaler (Austria), Charlotte Collins (translator), for A Whole Life (Ein ganzes Leben)

Longlist
Maylis de Kerangal (France), Jessica Moore (translator), for Mend the Living (Réparer les vivants) 
Eka Kurniawan (Indonesia), Labodalih Sembiring (translator), for Man Tiger (Lelaki Harimau)
Fiston Mwanza Mujila (Democratic Republic of Congo), Roland Glasser (translator), for Tram 83 
Raduan Nassar (Brazil), Stefan Tobler (translator), for A Cup of Rage (Um Copo de Cólera)
Marie NDiaye (France), Jordan Stump (translator), for Ladivine
Kenzaburō Ōe (Japan), Deborah Boliver Boehm (translator), for Death by Water (水死)
Aki Ollikainen (Finland), Emily Jeremiah & Fleur Jeremiah (translator), for White Hunger (Nälkävuosi)

2017
The 2017 prize was judged by Nick Barley (Chair), Daniel Hahn, Helen Mort, Elif Shafak and Chika Unigwe. The longlist for the eighth Man Booker International Prize was announced on 14 March 2017, and the shortlist on 20 April 2017. The winner was announced on 14 June 2017. Grossman became the first Israeli author to win the prize, sharing the £50,000 award with translator Jessica Cohen. Nick Barley, who is the director of the Edinburgh International Book Festival, described the book as "an ambitious high-wire act of a novel [that] shines a spotlight on the effects of grief, without any hint of sentimentality. The central character is challenging and flawed, but completely compelling." The novel won over 126 other contenders.
Winner
David Grossman (Israel), Jessica Cohen (translator), for A Horse Walks into a Bar (סוס אחד נכנס לבר) 
Shortlist
Mathias Énard (France), Charlotte Mandell (translator), for Compass (Boussole)
Roy Jacobsen (Norway), Don Bartlett and Don Shaw (translators), for The Unseen (De usynlige)
Dorthe Nors (Denmark), Misha Hoekstra (translator), for Mirror, Shoulder, Signal (Spejl, skulder, blink)
Amos Oz (Israel), Nicholas de Lange (translator), for Judas (הבשורה על-פי יהודה)
Samanta Schweblin (Argentina), Megan McDowell (translator), for Fever Dream (Distancia de rescate), translated from Spanish

Longlist
Wioletta Greg (Poland), Eliza Marciniak (translator), for Swallowing Mercury (Guguly)
Stefan Hertmans (Belgium), David McKay (translator), for War and Turpentine (Oorlog en terpentijn)
Ismail Kadare (Albania), John Hodgson (translator), for The Traitor's Niche (Kamarja e turpit)
Jón Kalman Stefánsson (Iceland), Phil Roughton (translator), for Fish Have No Feet (Fiskarnir hafa enga fætur)
Yan Lianke (China), Carlos Rojas (translator), for The Explosion Chronicles (炸裂志)
Alain Mabanckou (France), Helen Stevenson (translator), for Black Moses (Petit Piment)
Clemens Meyer (Germany), Katy Derbyshire (translator), for Bricks and Mortar (Im Stein)

2018

The 2018 prize was judged by Lisa Appignanesi,  (Chair), Michael Hofmann, Hari Kunzru, Tim Martin and Helen Oyeyemi. The longlist for the ninth Man Booker International Prize was announced on 12 March 2018. The shortlist of six books was announced on 12 April 2018 at an event at Somerset House in London. The winner was announced on 22 May 2018 at the Victoria & Albert Museum in London. Tokarczuk is the first Polish author to win the award, and shared the prize with Croft. Lisa Appignanesi described Tokarczuk as a "writer of wonderful wit, imagination, and literary panache."

Winner

 Olga Tokarczuk (Poland), Jennifer Croft (translator), for Flights (Fitzcarraldo Editions (UK) Riverhead Books (USA)) (Bieguni)

Shortlist

 Virginie Despentes (France), Frank Wynne (translator), for Vernon Subutex 1 (MacLehose Press)
 Han Kang (South Korea), Deborah Smith (translator), for The White Book (Portobello Books) (흰)
 László Krasznahorkai (Hungary), John Batki, Ottilie Mulzet & George Szirtes (translators), for The World Goes On (Tuskar Rock Press) (Megy a világ)
 Antonio Muñoz Molina (Spain), Camilo A. Ramirez (translator), for Like a Fading Shadow (Tuskar Rock Press) (Como la sombra que se va)
 Ahmed Saadawi (Iraq), Jonathan Wright (translator), for Frankenstein in Baghdad (Oneworld) (فرانكشتاين في بغداد)

Longlist
 Laurent Binet (France), Sam Taylor (translator) for The 7th Function of Language (Harvill Secker) (La Septième Fonction du langage)
 Javier Cercas (Spain), Frank Wynne (translator), for The Impostor (MacLehose Press) (El impostor)
 Jenny Erpenbeck (Germany), Susan Bernofsky (translator), for Go, Went, Gone (Portobello Books) (Gehen, ging, gegangen)
 Ariana Harwicz (Argentina), Sarah Moses & Carolina Orloff (translators), for Die, My Love (Charco Press) (Matate, amor), translated from Spanish
 Christoph Ransmayr (Austria), Simon Pare (translator), for The Flying Mountain (Seagull Books) (Der fliegende Berg)
 Wu Ming-Yi (Taiwan), Darryl Sterk (translator), for The Stolen Bicycle (Text Publishing) (單車失竊記)
 Gabriela Ybarra (Spain), Natasha Wimmer (translator), for The Dinner Guest (Harvill Secker) (El comensal)

2019 

The 2019 prize was judged by Bettany Hughes (Chair), Maureen Freely, Angie Hobbs, Pankaj Mishra and Elnathan John. The longlist for the Man Booker International Prize was announced on 13 March 2019. The shortlist was announced on 9 April 2019. The winner was announced on 21 May 2019; Jokha Alharthi is the first author writing in Arabic to have won the Man Booker International Prize.

Winner

 Celestial Bodies (سـيّـدات الـقـمـر، روايـة) by Jokha Alharthi (Oman), translated from the Arabic by Marilyn Booth (Sandstone Press)
Shortlist

 The Years (Les Années) by Annie Ernaux (France), translated from the French by Alison L Strayer (Fitzcarraldo Editions)
 The Pine Islands (Die Kieferninseln) by Marion Poschmann (Germany), translated from the German by Jen Calleja (Serpent's Tail)
 Drive Your Plow Over the Bones of the Dead (Prowadź swój pług przez kości umarłych) by Olga Tokarczuk (Poland), translated from the Polish by Antonia Lloyd-Jones (Fitzcarraldo Editions)
 The Shape of the Ruins (La forma de las ruinas) by Juan Gabriel Vásquez (Colombia), translated from the Spanish by Anne McLean (MacLehose Press)
 The Remainder (La resta) by Alia Trabucco Zeran (Chile), translated from the Spanish by Sophie Hughes (And Other Stories)

Longlist

 Love in the New Millennium (新世纪爱情故事) by Can Xue (China), translated from the Chinese by Annelise Finegan Wasmoen (Yale University Press)
 At Dusk (해질무렵) by Hwang Sok-yong (South Korea), translated from the Korean by Sora Kim-Russell (Scribe)
 Jokes for the Gunmen (نكات للمسلحين) by Mazen Maarouf (Palestine-Iceland), translated from the Arabic by Jonathan Wright (Granta)
 Four Soldiers (Quatre Soldats) by Hubert Mingarelli (France), translated from the French by Sam Taylor (Portobello)
 Mouthful of Birds (Pájaros en la boca) by Samanta Schweblin (Argentina), translated from the Spanish by Megan McDowell (Oneworld)
 The Faculty of Dreams (Drömfakulteten) by Sara Stridsberg (Sweden), translated from the Swedish by Deborah Bragan-Turner (MacLehose Press)
 The Death of Murat Idrissi (De dood van Murat Idrissi) by Tommy Wieringa (The Netherlands), translated from the Dutch by Sam Garrett (Scribe)

2020 

The 2020 prize was judged by Ted Hodgkinson (Chair), Jennifer Croft, Valeria Luiselli, Jeet Thayil and Lucie Campos. The longlist for the prize was announced on 27 February 2020. The shortlist was announced 2 April 2020. The winner announcement was originally planned for 19 May 2020, however due to the COVID-19 pandemic it was postponed to 26 August 2020.

Winner

 The Discomfort of Evening (De avond is ongemak) by Marieke Lucas Rijneveld (the Netherlands), translated from the Dutch by Michele Hutchison (Faber & Faber)
Shortlist
The Enlightenment of The Greengage Tree (اشراق درخت گوجه سبز) by Shokoofeh Azar (Iran), translated from the Persian by Anonymous (Europa Editions)
The Adventures of China Iron (Las aventuras de la China Iron) by Gabriela Cabezón Cámara (Argentina), translated from the Spanish by Iona Macintyre and Fiona Mackintosh (Charco Press)
Tyll by Daniel Kehlmann (Germany), translated from the German by Ross Benjamin (Quercus)
Hurricane Season (Temporada de huracanes) by Fernanda Melchor (Mexico), translated from the Spanish by Sophie Hughes (Fitzcarraldo Editions)
The Memory Police (密やかな結晶) by Yōko Ogawa (Japan), translated from the Japanese by Stephen Snyder (Harvill Secker)
Longlist

 Red Dog (Buys: 'n grensroman) by Willem Anker (South Africa), translated from the Afrikaans by Michiel Heyns (Pushkin Press)
 The Other Name: Septology I – II (Det andre namnet – Septologien I – II) by Jon Fosse (Norway), translated from the Norwegian by Damion Searls (Fitzcarraldo Editions)
 The Eighth Life (Das achte Leben (Für Brilka)) by Nino Haratischvili (Georgia/Germany), translated from the German by Charlotte Collins and Ruth Martin (Scribe UK)
 Serotonin (Sérotonine) by Michel Houellebecq (France), translated from the French by Shaun Whiteside (William Heinemann)
 Faces on the Tip of My Tongue (Un renard à mains nues) by Emmanuelle Pagano (France), translated from the French by Sophie Lewis and Jennifer Higgins (Peirene Press)
 Little Eyes (Kentukis) by Samanta Schweblin (Argentina), translated from the Spanish by Megan McDowell (Oneworld)
 Mac and His Problem (Mac y su contratiempo) by Enrique Vila-Matas (Spain), translated from the Spanish by Margaret Jull Costa and Sophie Hughes (Harvill Secker)

2021 
The 2021 prize was judged by Lucy Hughes-Hallett (Chair), Aida Edemariam, Neel Mukherjee, Olivette Otele and George Szirtes. The longlist was announced on 30 March 2021, the shortlist on 22 April, and the winning author and translator on 2 June 2021.

Winner

At Night All Blood Is Black (Frère d'âme) by David Diop, translated from French by Anna Moschovakis (Pushkin Press)

Shortlist

 The Dangers of Smoking in Bed (Los peligros de fumar en la cama) by Mariana Enríquez, translated from Spanish by Megan McDowell (Granta Books)
 The Employees (De ansatte) by Olga Ravn, translated from Danish by Martin Aitken (Lolli Editions)
 When We Cease to Understand the World (Un verdor terrible) by Benjamín Labatut, translated from Spanish by Adrian Nathan West (Pushkin Press)
 In Memory of Memory (Памяти памяти) by Maria Stepanova, translated from Russian by Sasha Dugdale (Fitzcarraldo Editions)
 The War of the Poor (La Guerre des pauvres) by Éric Vuillard, translated from French by Mark Polizzotti (Picador)
Longlist

 I Live in the Slums by Can Xue, translated from Chinese by Karen Gernant & Chen Zeping (Yale University Press)
 The Pear Field (მსხლების მინდორი) by Nana Ekvtimishvili, translated from Georgian by Elizabeth Heighway (Peirene Press)
 The Perfect Nine: The Epic Gikuyu and Mumbi (Kenda Mũiyũru: Rũgano rwa Gĩkũyũ na Mũmbi) by Ngũgĩ wa Thiong'o, translated from Gikuyu by the author (Harvill Secker)
 Summer Brother (Zomervacht) by Jaap Robben, translated from Dutch by David Doherty (World Editions)
 An Inventory of Losses (Verzeichnis einiger Verluste) by Judith Schalansky, translated from German by Jackie Smith (MacLehose Press)
 Minor Detail (تفصيل ثانوي) by Adania Shibli, translated from Arabic by Elisabeth Jaquette (Fitzcarraldo Editions)
 Wretchedness (Eländet) by Andrzej Tichý, translated from Swedish by Nichola Smalley (And Other Stories)

2022 
The 2022 prize was judged by Frank Wynne (chair), Merve Emre, Petina Gappah, Viv Groskop and Jeremy Tiang. The longlist was announced on 10 March 2022; the shortlist on 7 April 2022 and the winner on 26 May 2022.

Winner

 Tomb of Sand  (रेत समाधि) by Geetanjali Shree, translated from Hindi by Daisy Rockwell (Tilted Axis Press)

Shortlist

 Cursed Bunny  (저주토끼) by Bora Chung, translated from Korean by Anton Hur (Honford Star)
 A New Name: Septology VI-VII  (Eit nytt namn – Septologien VI – VII) by Jon Fosse, translated from Norwegian by Damion Searls (Fitzcarraldo Editions)
 Heaven (ヘヴン)  by Mieko Kawakami, translated from Japanese by Sam Bett and David Boyd (Picador)
 Elena Knows  (Elena sabe) by Claudia Piñeiro, translated from Spanish by Frances Riddle (Charco Press)
The Books of Jacob  (Księgi Jakubowe) by Olga Tokarczuk, translated from Polish by Jennifer Croft (Fitzcarraldo Editions)

Longlist
After the Sun  (Efter solen) by Jonas Eika, translated from Danish by Sherilyn Hellberg (Lolli Editions)
More Than I Love My Life  (אתי החיים משחק הרבה) by David Grossman, translated from Hebrew by Jessica Cohen (Jonathan Cape)
The Book of Mother (Fugitive parce que reine)  by Violaine Huisman, translated from French by Leslie Camhi (Scribner)
Paradais (Páradais) by Fernanda Melchor, translated from Spanish by Sophie Hughes (Fitzcarraldo Editions)
Love in the Big City (대도시의 사랑법) by Sang Young Park, translated from Korean by Anton Hur (Tilted Axis Press)
Happy Stories, Mostly  (Cerita-cerita Bahagia, Hampir Seluruhnya) by Norman Erikson Pasaribu, translated from Indonesian by Tiffany Tsao (Tilted Axis Press)
Phenotypes  (Marrom e Amarelo) by Paulo Scott, translated from Portuguese by Daniel Hahn (And Other Stories)

2023 
The 2023 prize is being judged by Leïla Slimani (chair), Uilleam Blacker, Tan Twan Eng, Parul Sehgal and Frederick Studemann. The longlist was announced on 14 March 2023.

Longlist 

 Boulder by Spanish author Eva Baltasar, translated from Catalan by Julia Sanches and published in the UK by And Other Stories.
 Whale by Korean author Cheon Myeong-kwan, translated by Korean/American Chi-Young Kim and published in the UK by Europa Editions.
 The Gospel According to the New World by French author Maryse Condé, translated by Richard Philcox and published in the UK by World Editions.
 Standing Heavy by Ivorian author GauZ’, translated from French by Irish translator Frank Wynne and published in the UK by MacLehose Press.
 Time Shelter by Bulgarian author Georgi Gospodinov, translated by American Angela Rodel and published in the UK by Weidenfeld & Nicolson.
 Is Mother Dead by Norwegian author Vigdis Hjorth, translated by Charlotte Barslund and published in the UK by Verso Fiction.
 Jimi Hendrix Live in Lviv by Ukrainian author Andrey Kurkov, translated from Russian by Reuben Woolley and published in the UK by MacLehose Press.
 The Birthday Party by French author Laurent Mauvignier, translated by American Daniel Levin Becker and published in the UK by Fitzcarraldo Editions.
 While We Were Dreaming by German author Clemens Meyer, translated by Katy Derbyshire and published in the UK by Fitzcarraldo Editions.
 Pyre  by Indian author Perumal Murugan, translated from Tamil by Indian translator Aniruddhan Vasudevan and published in the UK by Pushkin Press.
 Still Born by Mexican author Guadalupe Nettel, translated from Spanish by Rosalind Harvey and published in the UK by Fitzcarraldo Editions.
 A System So Magnificent It Is Blinding by Swedish author Amanda Svensson, translated by Nichola Smalley and published in the UK by Scribe UK.
 Ninth Building by Chinese author Zou Jingzhi, translated by Singaporean Jeremy Tiang and published in the UK by Honford Star.

See also
Booker Prize for Fiction
Man Asian Literary Prize
National Book Award
Prix Goncourt
Neustadt International Prize for Literature
Franz Kafka Prize
List of literary awards

References

External links

Official website

2005 establishments in the United Kingdom
Awards established in 2005
International literary awards
British fiction awards
Translation awards
International
English-language literary awards